Burretiokentia is a genus of palms (Arecaceae) endemic to New Caledonia containing five species. The relationships between Burretiokentia and some other genera of the tribe Basseliniinae including Physokentia and the New Caledonia endemic Cyphophoenix are not clear.

List of species 
 Burretiokentia dumasii
 Burretiokentia grandiflora
 Burretiokentia hapala
 Burretiokentia koghiensis
 Burretiokentia vieillardii

References 

 Fairchild Tropical Botanic Garden
 Palm & Cycad Societies of Australia

Basseliniinae
Arecaceae genera
Endemic flora of New Caledonia